Germany competed at the 2013 World Championships in Athletics in Moscow, Russia, from 10–18 August 2013. 67 competitors were selected by the DLV.

Medalists
The following competitors from Germany won medals at the Championships

Results

Men
Track and road events

Field events

Combined events – Decathlon

Women
Track and road events

Field events

Combined events – Heptathlon

References

External links
 Official website

Nations at the 2013 World Championships in Athletics
World Championships in Athletics
Germany at the World Championships in Athletics